Yu'an District is a district of the city of Lu'an, Anhui Province, People's Republic of China. The government of Yu'an District is located in Yunlu Street.

Administrative divisions
In the present, Yu'an District has 3 subdistricts, 12 towns and 6 townships.
3 Subdistricts
 Gulou
 Xishi
 Xiaohuashan

12 Towns

6 Townships

References

External links
Official website of Yu'an District government

County-level divisions of Anhui
Lu'an